Nicolás Rodríguez García-Paz (born 30 April 1991) is a Spanish sailor. Rodríguez and Jordi Xammar won a bronze medal for Spain at the 2020 Summer Olympics in the men's 470 event.

References

External links
 
 
 

1991 births
Living people
Spanish male sailors (sport)
Olympic sailors of Spain
Olympic bronze medalists for Spain
Olympic medalists in sailing
Sailors at the 2020 Summer Olympics – 470
Medalists at the 2020 Summer Olympics
Sportspeople from Vigo